Mario Rizzi (3 March 1926 – 13 April 2012) was the Roman Catholic Italian titular archbishop of Bagnoregio and apostolic nuncio to Bulgaria 1991–1996.

Ordained to the priesthood in 1948, Rizzi became bishop in 1991.

Notes

1926 births
2012 deaths
20th-century Italian Roman Catholic titular archbishops
Apostolic Nuncios to Bulgaria